Tears of a Clown may refer to:

 Tears of a Clown (album), an album by Andre Nickatina
 Madonna: Tears of a Clown, two concerts by Madonna
 "Tears of a Clown", a song by Iron Maiden from the 2015 studio album The Book of Souls
 "The Tears of a Clown", a song by Smokey Robinson & the Miracles

See also
Pagliacci (disambiguation)

Works about clowns